High Stones, at , is the highest point within the boundaries of both the City of Sheffield and South Yorkshire, England.

High Stones lies on the Howden Moors towards in the northern Peak District National Park, between Langsett Reservoir to the north-east and Howden Reservoir to the south-west. The area is managed by the National Trust, as part of the Nether Hey area of their High Peak Estate.

Representation on Mapping 
High Stones is only shown on 1:25,000 scale maps and larger.

The cairn at High Stones is at the marked  point; being something over two feet tall means that the top of the cairn is just over 1800 ft above sea level.

References

Mountains and hills of the Peak District
National Trust properties in South Yorkshire
Hills and edges of South Yorkshire
Geography of Sheffield
Highest points of English counties